Estêvão Gomes, also known by the Spanish version of his name, Esteban Gómez (c. 1483 – 1538), was a Portuguese cartographer and explorer. He sailed at the service of Castile (Spain) in the fleet of Ferdinand Magellan, but deserted the expedition when they had reached the Strait of Magellan, and returned to Spain in May 1521. In 1524 he explored present-day Nova Scotia. While historical accounts vary, Gomes may have entered New York Harbor and seen the Hudson River . Because of his expedition, the 1529 Diogo Ribeiro world map outlines the East coast of North America almost perfectly.

Biography 
Gomes was of African descent, and was probably born in Porto, northern Portugal. He sailed to India on Portuguese ships during his youth. In 1518, he moved to Castile, where he was appointed a pilot in the Casa de Contratación in Seville.

In 1519, Gomes sailed with Magellan in the first circumnavigation of earth, as the pilot of the San Antonio. When they had reached the Strait of Magellan, though, he and several other men on the San Antonio deserted the expedition, returning to Spain with the San Antonio in May 1521. He was immediately jailed, but when the remaining ship of Magellan's expedition reached Spain in September 1522, and the surviving crew related their terrible experience, he was freed.

Gomes was able to convince Emperor Charles V to finance a new expedition to find a northern passage to the Spice Islands, the fabled Northwest Passage. A 50-ton caravel, La Anunciada, was built for the purpose.

The expedition sailed on September 24, 1524, from A Coruña, with 29 men forming the crew. He arrived in Cuba and later sailed north.Lawson, Russell M., The Sea Mark: Captain John Smith's Voyage to New England, University Press of New England, 2015, p. 39 Since there is no written account of the voyage, and only a map, there is considerable disagreement about Gomes' itinerary. Gomes may have gotten as far east as the Cabot Strait and Cape Breton (in today's Canadian province of Nova Scotia). He also entered Upper New York Bay and the Hudson River (which he named the "San Antonio River"). However, whether he traveled north to south or searched from south to north, is disputed. In either direction, he passed through Maine, where he thought the estuary of the Penobscot River to be the passage.  Gomes returned to Spain on August 21, 1525. During his voyage, Gomes abducted over 50 natives and took them back to Spain as evidence of a potentially lucrative slave trade. Charles V was reportedly horrified and set them free.

As a result of his expedition, the 1529 Diogo Ribeiro world map outlines the east coast of North America almost perfectly. For a long time, the northern half of the current US coast was named on maps as Tierra de Esteban Gómez.

In 1535, Gomes joined Pedro de Mendoza's expedition to Río de la Plata. During the expedition, he was killed in the Paraguay River by natives (1538).

See also
 Giovanni da Verrazzano
List of explorers
List of cartographers

Notes

Arsène Francoeur NGANGA.,2017,Estéban Gomez et Mathieu Dacosta:Marins noirs sur l'atlantique(XVIe et XVIIe siècles).Préface du professeur John.K.Thornton,Edilivre(France)..

External links

1538 deaths
Deserters
Portuguese cartographers
16th-century explorers
Portuguese explorers of North America
Portuguese explorers of South America
1483 births
People from Porto
16th-century Portuguese people
Explorers of the United States
16th-century cartographers
Magellan expedition